Ostearius is a genus of dwarf spiders that was first described by J. E. Hull in 1911.

Species
 it contains two species:
Ostearius melanopygius (O. Pickard-Cambridge, 1880) (type) – South America. Introduced to Europe, Canary Is., Egypt, Turkey, South Africa, China and New Zealand
Ostearius muticus Gao, Gao & Zhu, 1994 – China

See also
 List of Linyphiidae species (I–P)

References

Araneomorphae genera
Cosmopolitan spiders
Linyphiidae